Telephone Conversation may refer to:

 Telephone call
Wole_Soyinka#Poetry_collections, a poetical work by Wole Soyinka
a 45-second track on We're Only in It for the Money by Frank Zappa and The Mothers of Invention